Thomas Drain was a Scottish professional footballer. A centre half, he played in the Football League for Blackpool.

References

Further reading

Year of birth missing
Year of death missing
Scottish footballers
Aberdeen F.C. players
Vale of Leven F.C. players
Blackpool F.C. players
Association football defenders